"Collide" is a single by American hip-hop and R&B singer Justine Skye, released on August 25, 2014. The track features a guest verse by American rapper Tyga and was produced by DJ Mustard.

In late 2022 the song become a viral audio on TikTok which prompted a significant increase of streams on music platforms and additions to radio stations around the world. In 2023, the song was later included on Skye's second compilation album, Dark Side, along with a solo version and sped up remix.

Music video

A music video for the single featuring Tyga, was released on Justine's YouTube channel, on October 8, 2014 and has today over 20 million views.

Chart performance

Certifications

References

2014 songs
2014 singles
Justine Skye songs
Tyga songs
Atlantic Records singles
Song recordings produced by Mustard (record producer)
Songs written by Elijah Blake
Songs written by Tyga